María Jimena Piccolo (born July 22, 1985), better known as Jimena Piccolo is an Argentine actress, singer and radio host.

Biography
María Jimena Piccolo was born on July 22, 1985 in Buenos Aires, Argentina.

Career 
María Jimena Piccolo began her career in television with an advertisement for Banco Río in 1991. In 1993, she was part of the cast of the television series Primer amor. In 1994, she made her film debut, with the movie Amigomío. From 1995 to 1998, she was part of the cast of the youth television series Chiquititas. Between 1996 and 1998, she made the theatrical seasons of Chiquititas. In 1999, she was part of the cast of the television series Trillizos ¡dijo la partera!. In August 2001, she makes a small participation in the youth television series Chiquititas. In 2001, she was summoned by Cris Morena for the special Chiquititas de Oro where she and the most prominent cast members of all seasons came together to receive the award Chiquititas de Oro. In 2002, she was part of the cast of the television series Kachorra. In 2005, she was part of the cast of the television series  Amor mío. In 2005, she was part of the cast of the television series ¿Quién es el Jefe?. In 2006, she starred in an episode of Mujeres asesinas. In 2007, she was part of the cast of the television series Los cuentos de Fontanarrosa. In 2008, she was part of the cast of the television series Mujeres de nadie. In 2011, she starred in an episode of Decisiones de Vida. In 2011, she was part of the cast of the television series Yo soy virgen. In 2014, she was part of the cast of the television series Somos familia. In 2014, she performed the play Ego, mi verdadera historia. In 2015, she performed the play La vida prestada. In 2017, she performed the play El Mundo de Stefy y vos.

Filmography

Television

Movies

Theater

Discography

Soundtrack albums 

 1995 — Chiquititas Vol. 1
 1996 — Chiquititas Vol. 2
 1997 — Chiquititas Vol. 3
 1998  — Chiquititas Vol. 4

Awards and nominations

See also
 List of Argentines
 Chiquititas
 Nadia Di Cello

External links
 
 

1985 births
Living people
People from Buenos Aires
Argentine actresses